6th European Union–African Union Summit took place in Brussels on 17 and 18 February 2022. The event was initially scheduled for October 2020, but was postponed in the COVID-19 pandemic context. The summit was co-chaired by the President of the European Council, Charles Michel and the President of Senegal who at the time served as the Chairperson of the African Union, Macky Sall. The event brought together representatives of the EU and the AU as well as of their member states. A research hired by the European Commission concluded that despite being Africa's top trading partner, European Union is not perceived as a major partner for African states with the United States and China ranked higher. The summit was organized to address some of those concerns as well as complex issues related to aspects of African immigration to Europe and European Union response to the COVID-19 pandemic. The AERAP Africa-Europe Science Collaboration Platform organised a side event on the contribution of collaborative research and development to EU-Africa relations.

References

See also
 2007 Africa–EU Summit
 Foreign relations of the European Union

2022 conferences
2022 in politics
Foreign relations of the African Union
Foreign relations of the European Union